Gregory Berríos (born January 24, 1979) is a volleyball player from Puerto Rico, who was a member of the Men's National Team that ended up in sixth place at the 2007 FIVB Men's World Cup in Japan. Playing as a libero he was named Best Receiver at the 2003 NORCECA Championship and Best Digger, Best Receiver and Best Libero at the 2009 NORCECA Championship. He won with his team the Bronze medal and the Best Libero and Best Receiver individual awards at the 2010 Pan-American Cup.

Personal life 

Berríos was born in San Juan, Puerto Rico to Gregorio Berríos and Ivette Torres. Berrios has three brothers, (Héctor Berríos, Aksel Berríos and Christopher Berríos). Berríos is a graduate of Academia Santa Teresita in Santurce, Puerto Rico and did play volleyball in high school.

College 
Berríos attended the University of Puerto Rico, Rio Piedras Campus where he majored in Visual Arts. He was a freshman in 1998, played outside hitter for the college team until 2001 winning their LAI Volleyball Championship against University of the Sacred Heart (Puerto Rico).

Clubs
  Playeros de San Juan (1999–2001)
  Changos de Naranjito (2002–2005)
  Málaga España (2004–2005)
  J'Hayber Elche (2005–2006)
  Patriotas de Lares (2006–2009)
  CV Almería (2006–2007)
  Paris Volley (2007–2008)
  Cesu Alus 'Cesis' (2008–2009)
  Mets de Guaynabo (2009–2011)
  Capitanes de Arecibo (2012–2014)
  Nice Volley-Ball (2013–2014)

International

Recent international competition 
 2010
  V Panamerican Cup (Bronze Medal)
 2009
  NORCECA Continental Championship (Bronze Medal)
 2008
  NORCECA Continental Olympic Qualifying Championship (Silver Medal)
 2007
 FIVB World Cup JAPAN (6th place)
 Pan American Games (6th place)
  NORCECA Continental Championship (Silver Medal)
 2006
 FIVB World Championships JAPAN (12th place)
  XX Central American and Caribbean Games (Gold Medal)
 2005
  FIVB World Championships Qualification (Silver Medal)
 2003
 NORCECA Continental Championship (5th place)
 2002
  XIX Central American and Caribbean Games (Gold Medal)

Awards

Individuals
 2003 NORCECA Championship "Best Receiver"
 2005 FIVB World Championships 2006 Qualification Tournament "Best Digger"
 2005 FIVB World Championships 2006 Qualification Tournament "Best Libero"
 2006 FIVB World Championships 2006 "2nd Best Digger"
 2007 FIVB World Cup 2007 "3rd Best Digger"
 2007 Pan-American Games "Best Defender"
 2008 Olympics Games Qualification Tournament "Best Digger"
 2009 NORCECA FIVB World Championship Qualification Tournament "Best Libero"
 2009 NORCECA FIVB World Championship Qualification Tournament "Best Receiver"
 2009 NORCECA Championship "Best Digger"
 2009 NORCECA Championship "Best Receiver"
 2009 NORCECA Championship "Best Libero"
 2010 Pan-American Cup "Best Libero"
 2010 Pan-American Cup "Best Receiver"
 2011 Puerto Rico Volleyball League "Best Libero"
 2012 Summer Olympics Qualification Tournament "Best Libero"

References

External links
 FIVB Profile
 FIVB Best Diggers

1979 births
Living people
Puerto Rican men's volleyball players
Volleyball players at the 2007 Pan American Games
Puerto Rican expatriate sportspeople in Spain
Central American and Caribbean Games gold medalists for Puerto Rico
Competitors at the 2002 Central American and Caribbean Games
Competitors at the 2006 Central American and Caribbean Games
Puerto Rican expatriate sportspeople in France
Central American and Caribbean Games medalists in volleyball
Pan American Games competitors for Puerto Rico